Uwe Dotzauer (born 19 February 1959 in Klingenthal) is an East German nordic combined skier who competed from 1977 to 1987. He won two medals at the 1982 FIS Nordic World Ski Championships in Oslo with gold in the 3 x 10 team and bronze in the 15 km individual.

Dotzauer won the Nordic combined event at the 1980 Holmenkollen ski festival. He competed in two Winter Olympics, finishing 5th in 1980 and 7th in 1984.

Dotzauer's only additional victory came in Seefeld, Austria in 1983.

References

Holmenkollen winners since 1892 - click Vinnere for downloadable pdf file 

1959 births
Nordic combined skiers at the 1980 Winter Olympics
Nordic combined skiers at the 1984 Winter Olympics
German male Nordic combined skiers
Olympic Nordic combined skiers of East Germany
Holmenkollen Ski Festival winners
Living people
FIS Nordic World Ski Championships medalists in Nordic combined
People from Klingenthal
Sportspeople from Saxony